Bennett Madison (born March 28, 1981) is an American author.

Early life
Bennett Madison was born in 1981 in Washington, D.C., and grew up in Silver Spring, Maryland.  He was educated at Montgomery Blair High School and attended Sarah Lawrence College.  He was a childhood friend of John Walker Lindh.

Career
Madison's first book, I Hate Valentine’s Day, a light polemic against Valentine’s Day, was published in 2004. He moved to Brooklyn, New York shortly thereafter and began work on several novels. He has published two additional books—Lulu Dark Can See Through Walls (2005) and Lulu Dark & the Summer of the Fox (2006)—about a teenage girl detective, Lulu Dark. In 2009 HarperTeen published his third novel, The Blonde of the Joke. 
HarperTeen published September Girls in 2013.

Madison has described himself as being "an open and enthusiastic gay."

Bibliography 
 I Hate Valentine's Day (2004)
 Lulu Dark Can See Through Walls (2005)
 Lulu Dark & the Summer of the Fox (2006)
 The Blonde of the Joke (2009)
September Girls (2013)

References

External links 

21st-century American novelists
American male novelists
1981 births
Living people
Writers from Brooklyn
People from Silver Spring, Maryland
American gay writers
American LGBT novelists
American children's writers
21st-century American male writers
Novelists from New York (state)
21st-century LGBT people